Ville Juhani Nieminen (born April 6, 1977) is a Finnish former professional ice hockey forward who played over 400 games in the National Hockey League.

Playing career
Nieminen started his professional hockey career with Tappara in the Finnish SM-liiga, in the 1994–95 season. He was drafted by the Colorado Avalanche as their third-round pick, #78 overall, in the 1997 NHL Entry Draft. Nieminen spent three seasons in the AHL with the Hershey Bears before moving to the NHL.

Known for his non-stop motor mouth and aggressive in-your-face style of play, Nieminen was infamous as an annoying opponent on the ice, whose style was heavily reminiscent of Esa Tikkanen.  Nieminen was also known for a relaxed personality and his trademark odd sense of humour outside the rink.

Nieminen played for several teams in the NHL, and spent the 2004–05 lockout season playing for his home team, Tappara. He signed with the New York Rangers for the 2005–06 NHL season, and was traded to San Jose on March 8, 2006.

He represented Finland in international play at the 2004 World Cup of Hockey, and when he was unable to compete at the 2005 IIHF World Championships, he provided commentary on Finnish television with fellow NHL player Tuomo Ruutu. Ville is a popular colour commentator due to his sense of humour and knowledge of the game.

On February 27, 2007, he was traded to the St. Louis Blues. His contract expired in July, and he signed a two-year contract with the Malmö Redhawks, then of the Swedish Allsvenskan. After a single season Nieminen returned to his native land signing with his original club Tappara of the SM-liiga.

On June 16, 2010, Nieminen signed a one-year contract with Russian team, HC Sibir Novosibirsk, of the KHL. On May 6, 2011, Nieminen signed a one-year deal to remain in Russia Neftekhimik Nizhnekamsk. During the 2011–12 season, Nieminen remained unsettled, and moved twice in stints with Dinamo Riga and Örebro HK of the HockeyAllsvenskan.

Nieminen returned to Finland the following season, re-joining original club, Tappara on a two-year deal on May 2, 2012. During the 2012–13 season, Nieminen enjoyed a scoring resurgence, leading the team with 22 goals and 50 points in a second place regular season finish. He helped Tappara to a silver medal finish in the playoffs, leading the league with 41 penalty minutes.

Nieminen played a final professional season in 2014–15 with Lukko, scoring 14 points in 50 games, before opting to pursue a coaching career as head coach with Mestis club KeuPa.

Coaching career
 KeuPa HT 2015–2016, Mestis. 
 Jukurit 2016–2018, Liiga. 
 Lahti Pelicans 2018–2020, Liiga.
 Modo Hockey 2020–, HockeyAllsvenskan. Fired.

Career statistics

Regular season and playoffs

International

Awards and honours

References

External links 

1977 births
Living people
Calgary Flames players
Chicago Blackhawks players
Colorado Avalanche draft picks
Colorado Avalanche players
Dinamo Riga players
Finnish ice hockey left wingers
HC Neftekhimik Nizhnekamsk players
HC Sibir Novosibirsk players
Hershey Bears players
Ice hockey players at the 2002 Winter Olympics
Ice hockey players at the 2006 Winter Olympics
Ice hockey people from Tampere
KOOVEE players
Lukko players
Malmö Redhawks players
Medalists at the 2006 Winter Olympics
New York Rangers players
Olympic ice hockey players of Finland
Olympic medalists in ice hockey
Olympic silver medalists for Finland
Örebro HK players
Pittsburgh Penguins players
St. Louis Blues players
San Jose Sharks players
Stanley Cup champions
Tappara players